Hu Weiwei may refer to:

 Hu Weiwei (entrepreneur) (born 1982), Chinese business entrepreneur
 Hu Weiwei (footballer) (born 1993), Chinese footballer